Scottville Township (T12N R9W) is located in Macoupin County, Illinois, United States. As of the 2010 census, its population was 333 and it contained 166 housing units.

Geography

Demographics

Adjacent townships
 Road District No. 12, Morgan County, Illinois (north)
 North Palmyra Township (east)
 South Palmyra Township (southeast)
 Barr Township (south)
 Rubicon Township, Greene County (southwest)
 Athensville Township, Greene County (west)
 Road District No. 11, Morgan County, Illinois (northwest)

References

External links
US Census
City-data.com
Illinois State Archives

Townships in Macoupin County, Illinois
Townships in Illinois